Nicole Denise Cooke, MBE (born 13 April 1983) is a Welsh former professional road bicycle racer and Commonwealth, Olympic and World road race champion. At Beijing in 2008 she became the first British woman to win a Gold Olympic medal in any cycling discipline.  Cooke announced her retirement from the sport on 14 January 2013 at the age of 29.

==Early life==
Cooke was born in Swansea her best friend is Hayley Crane tonbridge, and grew up in Wick, Vale of Glamorgan. She attended Brynteg Comprehensive School in Bridgend,  where she gained the Rankin Prize, awarded each year for the highest academic achievement by a girl at GCE A Levels. She began cycling at 11, starting at Cardiff Ajax Cycling Club of which she is a life member. At 16 she won her first senior national title, becoming the youngest rider to take the senior women's title at the 1999 British National Road Race Championships. At 17 she became the youngest rider to win the senior women's title at the 2001 British National Cyclocross Championships.  Later that year Cooke won her second senior women's title at the 2001 British National Road Race Championships. . She won four UCI World Championship Junior titles, the road race in 2000 (Plouay, France), and the unique treble of mountain bike (Colorado, USA), time trial and road race (both Lisbon, Portugal) in 2001. As a result of this achievement she was awarded the 2001 Bidlake Memorial Prize for outstanding performance or contribution to British cycling.

International cycling career 2002–2007
Cooke turned professional for the Spanish-Ukrainian Deia-Pragma-Colnago team at the start of the 2002 season, basing herself in Forli, Italy where she shared a house with Australian rider and future  founder Rochelle Gilmore and learned Italian.

In her first professional season in 2002, Cooke won races in Italy, France and the Netherlands, and won the road race in the 2002 Commonwealth Games, the first ever win in the road discipline for Wales, either male or female. Cooke said her strength left her in her first Tour de France, aged 19, and a meeting in the team campervan suggested "medicines" to help her. She refused them.
The Deia-Pragma-Colnago team did not pay wages to Cooke and some colleagues. The team took Cooke's racing bicycle ahead of the world road championships in October and then returned it in time for the World Championships following a telephone call from Ernesto Colnago. Nicole was runner-up in the BBC Wales Sports Personality of the Year competition.

Cooke signed for the Acca Due O Team for 2003 and a new UCI regulation limiting team sizes split the Acca Due O squad in two for 2003 so Cooke rode for the new Ausra Gruodis-Safi Team with many of the younger riders. She rode for the merged and renamed Safi-Pasta Zara–Manhattan Team in 2004 and 2005.

In 2003 Cooke won La Flèche Wallonne Féminine, the Amstel Gold Race, the GP de Plouay and the GP San Francisco. She was the 2003 UCI Women's Road World Cup champion, youngest to win the competition and the first Briton. She came third in the world road championship. Cooke was voted BBC Wales Sports Personality of the Year. She hit a stationary police motorbike in June at the Tour du Grand Montréal required stitches in her left knee. Three weeks later she crashed again at the Giro de Trentino and had to miss 4 weeks of racing in July and August.

A winter and spring of rehabilitation failed to cure the recurring knee problem and she had surgery in May. At the end of June in her first race in eight months, she won her fifth British title. The following month Cooke won the Giro d'Italia Femminile, the youngest winner and the first British cyclist, male or female, to win a Grand Tour. At the 2004 Summer Olympics she placed fifth in the women's road race and 19th in the road time trial.

In 2005, she again won La Flèche Wallonne Féminine. She also won the GP Wallonie, Trofeo Alfredo Binda and the Trofeo Citta di Rosignano. She came second in the UCI Road World Championships.

At the end of 2005 she joined Swiss-based team Univega Pro-Cycling for two seasons, moving to Lugano in 2006 where she still lives.

In October 2005 the Welsh Cycling Union (WCU) selection commission decided to send a full team of six male riders to the 2006 Commonwealth Games, centered on supporting the aspirations of the National Coach Julian Winn, but also decided that Cooke would be sent as a one-person team to defend her title. In April 2016 Cooke would cite this as an example of the sexist attitudes of the sport she encountered throughout her career in an article – Welcome to the world of elite cycling where sexism is by design. In December 2005, when preparing for the 2006 Commonwealth Games, she broke a collarbone during the Manchester leg of the UCI Track World Cup; despite this, and the lack of any team support, she came third in the road race at the Games in March 2006. In her autobiography Cooke wrote "By their decision the WCU had gifted Australia, Canada, England and New Zealand my head on a plate". None of the six Welsh men completed the men's race.

On 1 August 2006 Cooke took over as number 1 on the UCI's women's world road race rankings. On 3 September 2006 she secured the UCI Women's Road World Cup for a second time after winning three world cup races in the season – La Flèche Wallonne Féminine, the Ladies Golden Hour and the Castilla y Leon World Cup Race. She also won the 2006 Grande Boucle, the women's Tour de France, by over 6 minutes. Other important wins included four stages and the overall title at Thüringen-Rundfahrt stage race and the Magali Pache Time Trial. She came third in the UCI World Road Race Championships.

In 2007, Cooke took the Geelong World Cup and the Ronde van Vlaanderen, the first two races on the 2007 UCI Women's Road World Cup. These early season wins led to her setting a new record in the UCI's women's world road race rankings for the gap between the first and second ranked cyclists. She also won the Trofeo Alfredo Binda for a second time, the Tour of Geelong, stage 2 of the GP Costa Etrusca and defended her Grande Boucle title.

A knee injury sustained prior to the last race of the 2007 World Cup, the Rund um die Nürnberger Altstadt, prevented Cooke from fully defending her title with close challenger Marianne Vos winning the final race and taking the title. Cooke had led the series since the first race. The injury forced her to miss the 2007 World Championships in Stuttgart. Cooke later admitted in an interview in 2008 that she had considered quitting the sport due to the injury.

2008: Olympic and World success

Cooke joined Team Halfords Bikehut for 2008. Her first victory of 2008 was the Tour de l'Aude, in which she rode with a Great Britain national team, taking the first stage and finishing fourth overall. On 28 June, Cooke won her ninth national road race champion title, and her eighth consecutive win.

Cooke represented Great Britain at the 2008 Summer Olympics in Beijing in the Women's Road Race where she won the gold on 10 August 2008, the 200th gold for Great Britain in the Modern Olympic Games.  The road cycling disciplines had been in the Olympic program since inception of the modern Olympics in 1896.  The Individual Road Race has featured in every games with the Team Time Trial, Individual time Trial and Team Road Race appearing in certain Olympic programs.  By 2008 Britain had a record of achieving six Silver and four bronze medals in all road disciplines and just three Bronze and two Silvers (Freddie Grubb – 1912 & Frank Southall – 1928) in the Individual Road Race. Thus, in 2008, Cooke not only recorded the first British Olympic gold medal in any cycling discipline for a female and also the first ever Gold Medal won in any road discipline by a British rider, irrespective of sex.  On the previous day none of the four British men entered in the Individual Road Race finished the race.  This was also the first ever Olympic Gold Medal won by a Welsh woman in an individual Olympic event.

She became the first cyclist, male or female, of any nation, to become the road race World Champion and Olympic gold medalist in the same year. An eventful race in Varese, Italy lasted 3 hours 42 minutes and 11 seconds, culminating in a sprint beating Marianne Vos in to 2nd place and Judith Arndt in 3rd. She credited her teammates for their work, pulling back the 12-rider break with 1 lap to go, putting Cooke back in contention.

Cooke's book, Cycle for life was published in October 2008 by Kyle Cathie. The book combines her passion and enthusiasm for cycling, together with her knowledge, proficiency and experience. It is aimed at cyclists at all levels, with expert advice on everything from getting started to turning competitive, covering commuting, racing and riding with friends.

Later career: 2009–2012

Cooke was appointed Member of the Order of the British Empire (MBE) in the 2009 New Year Honours. She was awarded the Transworld Sport "Female Athlete of the Year" title in recognition of her achievements in 2008. She was also awarded the Sunday Times Sportswoman of the Year award.

In June 2009 Cooke captured the Giro del Trentino title and won her tenth British National Road Race Championships title.

After Cooke's Vision1 Cycling Team finished 7th in the 2009 UCI Team Rankings, Cooke closed the team after being unable to attract a major sponsor as the financial crisis of 2007–2008 hit. Cooke signed for Equipe Nuernberg Versicherung for 2010. The team management had put the team together without signing a main sponsor and in December the team collapsed, leaving the riders without a team or salary. Cooke raced and trained with the British cycling team in the 2010 season. She won a stage at the Iurreta-Emakumeen Bira. At the 2010 Commonwealth Games Cooke placed fifth in the Women's Road Race, and at the 2010 UCI Road World Championships Cooke finished fourth in the road race.

In November 2010 Cooke joined the Italian-based Mcipollini-Giordana team for 2011. That year she won Stage 5 of the Giro D'Italia and took fourth place in the World Championships Road Race. In October Cooke won the GP Noosa, Australia.

Joining the Faren-Honda team for 2012, Cooke scored won Stage 6 of the Energiewacht Tour in the Netherlands. At the 2012 Summer Olympics in London, she competed in the road race, finishing 31st. Teammate Lizzie Armitstead took the silver medal. At the 2012 UCI Road World Championships Cooke finished 60th, five minutes behind winner Marianne Vos.

Cooke announced her retirement from the sport on 14 January 2013 at the age of 29. In a speech to journalists confirming her retirement, Cooke "exposed every aspect of corruption in professional cycling, from doping to gross gender inequality. It took 20 minutes to deliver and was met by journalists by stunned silence then applause" This caused Forbes to title their article "The Anti-Lance Armstrong".

After cycling
In March 2014, Cooke was reported to be studying for an MBA at Cardiff University. Her autobiography, The Breakaway, was published in the summer of 2014 to significant critical acclaim. The Guardian's Richard Williams described it as "a compelling and salutary account of the price she paid for the victories from which many others will benefit". It was named The Sunday Times Sports Book of the Year 2014 and long listed for the William Hill Sports Book of the Year prize and shortlisted for the Cross Sports Book Award. Since retirement Cooke has repeatedly spoken out campaigning for gender equality in sport and stronger investigatory powers for the anti-doping bodies.

In January 2017, Cooke gave written and oral evidence to the Parliamentary Select Committee for Culture, Media and Sport inquiry into Combatting Doping in Sport and stated that her information about doping in cycling, given as evidence to UKAD was subsequently not investigated by UKAD.  She also spoke out about the endemic sexism she encountered in sport. The Times described her evidence "GB gold medallist hits out at doping and sexism". The Independent'' stated "Former Olympic and world champion cyclist Nicole Cooke has issued a damning attack on British Cycling and Team Sky, condemning the governing bodies for their lack of accountability, sexism, and failure to fight the abuse of performance enhancing drugs (PEDs) within the sport".

Cooke appeared in Christmas University Challenge representing Cardiff University in a program that first aired on 1 January 2018. Other team members were Professor Laura McAllister,  Dr Rhys Jones and Laura Trevelyan.

Palmarès

1999
 1st  Road race, National Road Championships
2000
 1st  World Junior Road Race Championships
 2nd National Cyclo-cross Championships
 3rd World Junior Cross Country MTB Championships
2001
1st  World Junior Road Race Championships
1st  World Junior Time Trial Championships,
1st  World Junior Cross Country MTB Championships
1st  Road race, National Road Championships
1st  National Mountainbike Championships
1st  National Cyclo-cross Championships
1st Young rider classification, Grand Prix de Quebec
1st Mountains Classification

2002
1st  Commonwealth Games Road Race Championships
1st  Road race, National Road Championships
1st Trofeo Citta di Rosignano
1st Memorial Pasquale de Carlo
1st Mountains classification Trofeo Banca Popolare
1st Stage 2
1st Ronde van Westerbeek
1st Young rider classification Giro della Toscana
1st Young rider classification Giro del Trentino
3rd Overall Tour Midi Pyrenees
1st Mountains classification 
1st Stage 2 
3rd Veulta Castilla-y-Leon

2003
1st  Road race, National Road Championships
1st  Overall UCI Women's Road World Cup
1st Amstel Gold
1st La Flèche Wallonne Féminine
1st GP de Plouay
1st GP San Francisco
1st Stage 5 Holland Ladies Tour
1st Mountains classification Vuelta Castilla y Leon
1st Young rider classification Trofeo Banco Populare Alto Adige
1st Young rider classification Giro della Toscana
1st Stage 3a
3rd World Road Race Championships

2004
1st  Giro d'Italia Femminile
1st Stage 8
1st  Road race, National Road Championships
1st GP San Francisco
1st Points classification Giro della Toscana
1st Young rider classification

2005
1st  Road race, National Road Championships
1st La Flèche Wallonne Féminine
1st GP Wallonie
1st Trofeo Alfredo Binda-Comune di Cittiglio
1st Trofeo Citta di Rosignano
1st Stage 5 Holland Ladies Tour
1st Stage 1a Giro Della Toscana
2nd World Road Race Championships

2006
1st  Overall Grande Boucle Féminine Internationale
1st Stages 1 & 2
1st  Overall Thüringen Rundfahrt der Frauen
1st Stages 2, 4a, 4b & 5
1st  Road race, National Road Championships
1st  Overall, UCI Women's Road World Cup
1st GP Castilla y León
1st La Flèche Wallonne Féminine
1st The Ladies Golden Hour
2nd Open de Suède Vårgårda
2nd Coupe du Monde Cycliste Féminine de Montréal
3rd GP de Plouay
1st Magali Pache TT
1st Mountains classification Tour of New Zealand
1st Points classification Giro della Toscana
3rd  Commonwealth Games Road Race Championships
3rd World Road Race Championships

2007
1st UCI World Rankings
1st  Road race, National Road Championships
1st  Overall Grande Boucle Féminine Internationale
1st Tour Geelong
1st Trofeo Alfredo Binda-Comune di Cittiglio
1st GP Costa Etrusca
2nd Overall, UCI Women's Road World Cup
1st Tour of Flanders
1st Geelong
2nd GP de Plouay
2nd La Flèche Wallonne Féminine
4th Magali Pache TT
2008
 1st  Road race, Olympic Games
 1st  UCI Road World Championships
 1st  Road race, National Road Championships
 1st Stage 1 Tour de l'Aude Cycliste Féminin
2009
 1st  Overall Giro del Trentino Alto Adige-Südtirol
1st Stage 2
 1st  Road race, National Road Championships
 Iurreta-Emakumeen Bira
1st Stages 2 & 3b
2010
 1st Stage 3 Emakumeen Bira
 2nd La Flèche Wallonne Féminine
 3rd Road race, National Road Championships
2011
 1st Stage 5 Giro d'Italia Femminile
 2nd Road race, National Road Championships
2012
 1st Stage 5 Energiewacht Tour

References

External links

 
 An interview with Nicole Cooke
 An Video interview with Nicole Cooke
 
 
 

1983 births
Living people
Welsh female cyclists
Commonwealth Games gold medallists for Wales
Commonwealth Games bronze medallists for Wales
Cyclists at the 2002 Commonwealth Games
Cyclists at the 2006 Commonwealth Games
Cyclists at the 2004 Summer Olympics
Cyclists at the 2008 Summer Olympics
Cyclists at the 2012 Summer Olympics
Olympic cyclists of Great Britain
Olympic gold medallists for Great Britain
UCI Road World Champions (women)
British cycling road race champions
Members of the Order of the British Empire
Sportspeople from Swansea
People educated at Ysgol Brynteg
Welsh Olympic medallists
Olympic medalists in cycling
Cyclists at the 2010 Commonwealth Games
Welsh expatriate sportspeople in Switzerland
Medalists at the 2008 Summer Olympics
Sportspeople from Lugano
Commonwealth Games medallists in cycling
The Sunday Times Sportswoman of the Year winners
Medallists at the 2002 Commonwealth Games
Medallists at the 2006 Commonwealth Games